This is a list of Holy Cross Crusaders football players in the NFL Draft.

Key

Selections

References

Holy Cross

Holy Cross Crusaders NFL Draft